Outros Lugares is the first album by the Portuguese music composer António Pinho Vargas. It was released in 1983.

Track listing

Personnel
 António Pinho Vargas - piano
 José Nogueira - saxophone
 Pedro Barreiros - bass guitar
 Mário Barreiros - drums
 Artur Guedes - double bass

1983 debut albums
António Pinho Vargas albums